Tropical Storm Merbok, known in the Philippines as Tropical Depression Violeta, was a weak, but destructive tropical storm which worsened the conditions in the Philippines, previously affected by Typhoon Muifa, just 2 days after that storm. This is also the first tropical cyclone recognized by the Japan Meteorological Agency, but not Joint Typhoon Warning Center, since Changmi in 2002. The fortieth tropical cyclone and twenty-ninth named storm of the very active 2004 Pacific typhoon season, the origins of Merbok can be traced from a disturbance in the Philippine Sea early on November 22, with the PAGASA first issuing advisories as Tropical Depression Violeta, to the east of Baler, Aurora. The JMA followed suit, assigning the name Merbok as it strengthened to a tropical storm; however, the PAGASA held the system as a tropical depression. The storm soon made landfall on the night of the same day, while gradually weakening over the high terrains of Luzon. The weakened system emerged off the northwest coast of the country before the last advisory was issued by the two agencies. The remnants moved to the northwest, before dissipating, southwest of Taiwan.

Throughout its passage, Merbok was blamed for 31 individuals killed and causing over ₱12.368 billion ($254 million) worth of damages across Luzon. Because of the damages exceeding billions, the Philippine name Violeta was retired and replaced with Vicky.

Meteorological history

Preparations and impact
Merbok affected the Philippines after Typhoon Muifa (2004) stalled near Luzon before hitting the area as a Category 1 typhoon. Violeta caused landslides across Northern and Central Luzon that destroyed over 330 houses across the region. There were also reports of heavy flooding. The heaviest rainfall recorded was in Baler, peaking with 185.2 mm as the storm passed. Over 31 people died, and 187 were injured as a result of the storm.

Aftermath and retirement

See also

 Other tropical cyclones named Merbok

References

Tropical cyclones in 2004